Achille Jubinal (24 October 1810 – 23 December 1875) was a French medievalist.

External links
 

1810 births
1875 deaths
French medievalists
French male non-fiction writers